Markus Marthinus Johannes Labuschagné (born 30 January 1998) is a South African rugby sevens player for the South Africa national team and a rugby union player for  in the Under-21 Provincial Championship. His regular position is fullback.

References

External links
 

1998 births
Living people
South African rugby union players
South Africa international rugby sevens players
Rugby union fullbacks
Rugby union players from Pretoria